Varnals Creek is a  long 3rd order tributary to the Haw River, in Alamance County, North Carolina.

Course
Varnals Creek rises in a pond about 2 miles southeast of Rock Creek in Alamance County, North Carolina and then flows northeast to the Haw River about 4 miles south of Swepsonville, North Carolina.

Watershed
Varnals Creek drains  of area, receives about 46.2 in/year of precipitation, and has a wetness index of 413.35 and is about 50% forested.

See also
List of rivers of North Carolina

References

Rivers of North Carolina
Rivers of Alamance County, North Carolina